Arne Næss (21 February 1925 – 13 December 2009) was a Norwegian politician from the Christian Democratic Party.

Biography
He was born in Bergen, Norway. He was elected to Bergen city council in 1964, became deputy mayor in 1976 and mayor in 1984. He was Bergen's first Christian Democratic mayor. He served as mayor from 1984 to 1985 and 1988 to 1989.

Næss was a board member of the Bergen International Festival, the Bergenshalvøens Kommunale Kraftselskap, the Norwegian Water Resources and Energy Directorate, and the company that regulates the Askøy Bridge. In Motorførernes Avholdsforbund he was a board member from 1956 to 1968 and chaired the central committee from 1976 to 1980. In 1983 he was decorated with the Order of the Dannebrog.

Denominationally, he was a member of the Evangelical Lutheran Free Church of Norway. He was married and had three children, though he was predeceased by his wife in 1992. Næss died in December 2009.

References

1925 births
2009 deaths
Christian Democratic Party (Norway) politicians
Mayors of Bergen
Norwegian temperance activists
Norwegian Lutherans
Order of the Dannebrog
20th-century Lutherans